Piper truman-yunckeri is a species of plant in the family Piperaceae. It is endemic to Ecuador.

References

Flora of Ecuador
truman-yunckeri
Least concern plants
Taxonomy articles created by Polbot